The Phalangopsidae are a recently reconstituted family of crickets (Orthoptera: Ensifera), based on the type genus Phalangopsis Serville, 1831 from South America.  Priority for family-group names based on this genus dates from Blanchard's "Phalangopsites".

Distribution
Species in this family are widely distributed, especially southern Hemisphere (i.e. continents excluding Europe, most of N. America and Antarctica).  These terrestrial Orthoptera, like the majority of crickets, tend to thrive in tropical or subtropical environments.

Subfamilies, tribes and selected genera
The Orthoptera Species File lists:
subfamily Cachoplistinae Saussure, 1877 – Africa, Asia
 tribe Cachoplistini Saussure, 1877
 Cacoplistes Brunner von Wattenwyl, 1873
 Homoeogryllini Gorochov, 1986
 Homoeogryllus Guérin-Méneville, 1847
 Meloimorpha Walker, 1870
Luzarinae Hebard, 1928 – Central and South America
 subtribe Amphiacustina Hubbell, 1938
†Araneagryllus Heads, 2010
 Mayagryllus Desutter-Grandcolas & Hubbell, 1993
 subtribe Lernecina Desutter-Grandcolas, 1987
 subtribe Luzarina Hebard, 1928
 Luzara Walker, 1869
 Luzarida Hebard, 1928
Paragryllinae Desutter-Grandcolas, 1987 - widespread tropical, mostly southern hemisphere
 tribe Aclodini Desutter-Grandcolas, 1992
 Aclodes Hebard, 1928
 Paraclodes Desutter-Grandcolas, 1992
 Uvaroviella Chopard, 1923
 tribe Paragryllini Desutter-Grandcolas, 1987
 subtribe Adelosgryllina Gorochov, 2019 - south America
 Adelosgryllus Mesa & Zefa, 2004
 subtribe Brevizaclina Gorochov, 2014
 Brevizacla Gorochov, 2003
 Mikluchomaklaia Gorochov, 1986
 subtribe Mexiaclina Gorochov, 2014
 Mexiacla Gorochov, 2007
 Oaxacla Gorochov, 2007
 Paragryllodes Karny, 1909
 subtribe Neoaclina Desutter-Grandcolas, 1988 - S. America: other genera
 Neoacla Desutter-Grandcolas, 1988
 subtribe Paragryllina Desutter-Grandcolas, 1987 - S. America & Africa: other genera
 Paragryllus Guérin-Méneville, 1844
 subtribe Strogulomorphina Desutter-Grandcolas, 1988 - S. America: other genera
 Strogulomorpha Desutter-Grandcolas, 1988
 no subtribe:
 Apteracla Gorochov, 2009
 Caltathra Otte, 1987
 Escondacla Nischk & Otte, 2000
 Laranda (insect) Walker, 1869
 Pseudendacustes Chopard, 1928
Phalangopsinae Blanchard, 1845
 Endacustini Gorochov, 1986
 Luzaropsini Gorochov, 1986
 Otteiini Koçak & Kemal, 2009
 Phalangopsini Blanchard, 1845
 Phalangacris Bolívar, 1895
 Phalangopsis Serville, 1831
Phaloriinae Gorochov, 1985 – Africa, Asia & Pacific
 tribe Phaloriini Gorochov, 1985
 Phaloria (insect) Stål, 1877
 Trellius Gorochov, 1988
 Vescelia Stål, 1877
 tribe Subtiloriini Gorochov, 2003
 unplaced genus† Electrogryllus Gorochov, 1992
incertae sedis
 Megacris – monotypic: M. lipsae Desutter-Grandcolas, 2012
 Stalacris – monotypic: S. meridionalis Desutter-Grandcolas, 2013

References

External links
 
 

Orthoptera families
Ensifera
crickets